Ossian Smyth is an Irish Green Party politician who has served as a Minister of State since July 2020. He has been a Teachta Dála (TD) for the Dún Laoghaire constituency since 2020.

Smyth holds a Bachelor of Arts in Computer Science from Trinity College Dublin.

Smyth was elected to Dún Laoghaire–Rathdown County Council for the Dún Laoghaire local electoral area at the 2014 local election. He served as Cathaoirleach of the County Council from 2018 to 2019. He was re-elected to the council at the 2019 local election, and at the general election in February 2020, he was elected as a TD for Dún Laoghaire. Tom Kivlehan was co-opted to Smyth's seat on the County Council.

Following the formation of a new government of Fianna Fáil, Fine Gael and the Green Party, Smyth was appointed as a Minister of State on 1 July 2020. He was appointed as Minister of State at the Department of Public Expenditure and Reform with responsibility for Public Procurement and eGovernment and Minister of State at the Department of the Environment, Climate and Communications with responsibility for Communications and Circular Economy.

References

External links
Green Party profile

Living people
Year of birth missing (living people)
Alumni of Trinity College Dublin
Local councillors in Dún Laoghaire–Rathdown
Members of the 33rd Dáil
Green Party (Ireland) TDs
Ministers of State of the 33rd Dáil